The 46th Annual Tony Awards was broadcast by CBS from the Gershwin Theatre on May 31, 1992. The host was Glenn Close.

The ceremony
Presenters:
 Alan Alda
 Alec Baldwin
 Carol Channing
 Kirk Douglas
 Michael Douglas
 Richard Dreyfuss
 Daisy Eagan
 Farrah Fawcett
 Vincent Gardenia
 Danny Gerard
 Danny Glover
 Gene Hackman
 Judd Hirsch
 Patti LuPone
 Liza Minnelli
 Ian McKellen
 Tony Randall
 Lynn Redgrave
 Freddie Roman
 Ron Silver
 Sigourney Weaver

Musicals represented: 
 Crazy for You ("I Can't Be Bothered Now"/"Slap That Bass"/"Shall We Dance"/"I Got Rhythm" - Company)
 Falsettos ("Falsettoland"/"My Father's A Homo"/"Sitting Watching Jason Play Baseball" - Company)
 Five Guys Named Moe ("Five Guys Named Moe"/"Caledonia" - Company)
 Jelly's Last Jam ("That's How You Jazz" - Gregory Hines and Company)

Special Salute to Frank Loesser:
 The Most Happy Fella ("Happy to Make Your Acquaintance" - Spiro Malas, Sophie Hayden and Liz Larsen)
 Guys and Dolls ("Sit Down You're Rockin' the Boat"/"Finale" - Company)

Award winners and nominees
Winners are in bold

Special Tony Awards
Regional Theatre Award - The Goodman Theatre of Chicago 
Tony Honor - The Fantasticks

Multiple nominations and awards

These productions had multiple nominations:

11 nominations: Jelly's Last Jam 
9 nominations: Crazy for You
8 nominations: Dancing at Lughnasa and Guys and Dolls
7 nominations: Falsettos 
5 nominations: Two Shakespearean Actors 
4 nominations: Four Baboons Adoring the Sun, The Most Happy Fella and Two Trains Running
3 nominations: Conversations with My Father
2 nominations: Five Guys Named Moe and The Visit 

The following productions received multiple awards.

4 wins: Guys and Dolls 
3 wins: Crazy for You, Dancing at Lughnasa and Jelly's Last Jam 
2 wins: Falsettos

See also
 Drama Desk Awards
 1992 Laurence Olivier Awards – equivalent awards for West End theatre productions
 Obie Award
 New York Drama Critics' Circle
 Theatre World Award
 Lucille Lortel Awards

External links
Official Site Tony Awards

Tony Awards ceremonies
1992 in theatre
1992 theatre awards
Tony
1992 in New York City